Monte Giberto is a comune (municipality) in the Province of Fermo in the Italian region Marche, located about  south of Ancona and about  north of Ascoli Piceno.

Monte Giberto borders the following municipalities: Grottazzolina, Monte Vidon Combatte, Montottone, Petritoli, Ponzano di Fermo.

Demographic evolution

References

External links
 www.montegiberto.com

Cities and towns in the Marche